The sixth Central American and Caribbean Games were held in Guatemala City, Guatemala, from February 28 to March 12, 1950. The games included 1,390 athletes from fourteen nations, competing in nineteen sports.

Sports

Medal table

References
 Meta
 

 
Central American and Caribbean Games, 1950
Central American and Caribbean Games
Central American and Caribbean Games, 1950
Sports competitions in Guatemala City
Central
1950 in Caribbean sport
1950 in Central American sport
Multi-sport events in Guatemala
20th century in Guatemala City
Central American and Caribbean Games
Central American and Caribbean Games